Emmelina amseli is a moth of the family Pterophoridae. It is known from the Democratic Republic of Congo, Kenya and Tanzania.

References

Oidaematophorini
Moths of Africa
Moths described in 1969